Antarctic Science is a bimonthly peer reviewed scientific journal published by Cambridge University Press, focusing on all aspects of scientific research in the Antarctic. The editors-in-chief are David W. H. Walton (British Antarctic Survey), Walker O. Smith (Virginia Institute of Marine Sciences), Laurie Padman (Earth & Space Research), Alan Rodger (University of Aberystwyth), and John Smellie (University of Leicester).

This journal is a continuation of the "British Antarctic Survey Bulletin" published from 1963 to 1988. Under this former title the journal was indexed in Biological abstracts, Chemical abstracts, and GeoRef. This journal's name was changed to "Antarctic Science" in 1989.

Abstracting and indexing
This journal is indexed by the following services:

 Science Citation Index
 Current Contents/ Agriculture, Biology & Environmental Sciences
 Current Contents/ Physical, Chemical & Earth Sciences
 Zoological Record
 BIOSIS Previews

References

External links
 
 "British Antarctic Survey Bulletins" (1963-1988) Free full text articles available.

Cambridge University Press academic journals
Multidisciplinary scientific journals
Antarctica journals
Publications established in 1963
Bimonthly journals
Glaciology journals